The Volvo B12BLE is a low-entry city and suburban bus chassis launched in 2001 with a rear-mounted transverse engine. It superseded the Volvo B10BLE and is used as a base for single-decker buses in Europe and Australia.

The B12BLE features the 12-litre Volvo DH12 engine, which is based on the D12 engine from Volvo FH trucks. The DH12D engine meets Euro 3 emission level, and DH12E meets levels 4 and 5 with SCR technology.  The engine is mounted horizontally, as it was in the B10BLE. The radiator is mounted at the rear on the right-hand side.

From its launch in 2001 until 2005, it was available with the Euro 3 DH12D engine and ZF Ecomat2 & Voith D864.3E automatic transmissions.  From 2004/2005, the B12BLE was available with an updated electrical system. Available transmissions were 6-speed ZF 6HP602C, Voith DIWA864.3E and the Volvo I-Shift

In 2006 the chassis was updated with DH12E engine and ZF Ecomat4 / Voith D864.5 transmissions to meet Euro 4 & 5 emission standards.

The B12BLE was also available in the articulated form since 2005, which is known as the B12BLEA chassis. The B12BLE can be available in the rigid, tri-axle and articulated form.

The B12BLE is also available as a complete integral bus in Europe - the Volvo 8500LE and Volvo 8700LE.

Australia
Numerous public transport operators in Australia operate copious amounts of the B12BLE, either in its Euro III or Euro IV and Euro V guises.

The Volvo B12BLEA was conceptualised for the State Transit Authority of Sydney, Australia because the B7LA was too underpowered for many of Sydney's bus routes due to the hilly terrain. The world's first B12BLEA entered service with State Transit Authority of Sydney in late 2005.

State Transit Authority has placed an order for 80 B12BLEA articulated buses, and they will be assembled with Custom Coaches bodywork. The custom buses are powered by the 12-litre Volvo DH12 diesel engine with 6-speed ZF 6HP602C and 6HP604C automatic transmission.

State Transit Authority also ordered additional B12BLEA's in the Volgren CR228L body. The Volgren bodied buses are mostly seen running the high capacity Metrobus service. Most of the buses are built in Volgren's Tomago factory while the rest were built in Dandenong.

The Volvo B12BLE also come in a 12.5m configuration in Custom Coaches bodied CB60 and CB60 Evo 2 bodies. Volgren 12.5m variants were also ordered in both 12.5m and 14.5m bodies both Euro 5 compliant.

The 12.5m Custom Coaches CB60 are Euro 3 complaint while the newer CB60 Evo 2 bodied buses are Euro 5 complaint.

In October 2013, 20 B12BLEA's were transferred to new operator Transit Systems Sydney who took over Region 3.

In 2011, Transperth ordered 30 Volvo B12BLEAs. They were to be assembled with Volgren CR228L bodywork.

Transport for Brisbane purchased 119 B12BLEs in 2011 (with a further 30 in 2013), all of them are tri-axle. These are used on several high-frequency bus routes, mostly on the South East Busway.

Most of the B12BLE chassis that go to Australia are bodied by Australian companies such as Custom Coaches, Volgren and Bustech.

B12BLE

B12BLEA

Singapore

Two Volvo B12BLEAs are operated by Sentosa under the guise of a beach tram running on the island's Siloso Beach Tram route. The rear module of the bus consists of a large, sheltered standing area with an al-fresco seating area on the elevated part of the bus where the drive axle is. The buses are bodied by ComfortDelGro Engineering Corporation and are speed-limited for safety reasons. The vehicles were in Purple Livery.

End of production 
The sales of the B12BLE ceased in Europe in 2011, with the last B12BLE bus production order taking place in Transport for Brisbane (Australia) in 2013. It was superseded by the Volvo B9RLE and subsequentially the Volvo B8RLE.

See also 

 List of buses

References

External links

 Product description in Volvo's official website
 Sydney Buses B12BLE description

B12BLE
Low-entry buses
Tri-axle buses
Articulated buses
Bus chassis
Vehicles introduced in 2001